Rosemary Isabel Forbes (October 27, 1913 – November 14, 2002) was an American nurse, social activist, and the mother of John Forbes Kerry, the 68th United States Secretary of State and the 2004 Democratic nominee for president of the United States.

Early life
Rosemary Isabel Forbes was born in Paris, France, to American parents. She was one of eleven children of James Grant Forbes II of the Forbes family and Margaret Tyndal Winthrop of the Dudley–Winthrop family. Margaret was a granddaughter of politician Robert Charles Winthrop.

Work
She studied to be a nurse, and served in the Red Cross in Paris during World War II where she treated wounded soldiers at Montparnasse.  According to her son John, Margaret and her sister escaped from Paris on bicycles the day before the Nazis took the city. The sisters foraged their way across France while being shot at by German fighters, eventually making their way to Portugal before returning to the United States.

Margaret also was a Girl Scout leader at the troop and council level in Groton, Massachusetts for 50 years.

Personal life
On February 8, 1941, she married Richard John Kerry in Montgomery, Alabama. Kerry was a graduate of Yale University and Harvard Law School. Richard and Rosemary met when Kerry took a sculpture class at the resort of Saint-Briac, where the Forbes family built the family estate. Together, they were the parents of four children:
 Margaret "Peggy" Kerry (b. 1941);
 John Kerry (b. 1943), the former United States Secretary of State and 2004 Democratic nominee for President of the United States;
 Diana Kerry (b. 1947);
 Cameron Kerry (b. 1950), a Boston lawyer who was a General Counsel of the U.S. Department of Commerce and an adjunct law professor at Suffolk Law School. Cameron Kerry is the father of two daughters, Diana and Elizabeth (Peggy).

Kerry died on November 14, 2002 at Manchester-by-the-Sea, Massachusetts. Upon her death, her son John inherited "trusts with $300,000 to $1.5 million in assets."

References

External links
 
 The Ancestors of Senator John Forbes Kerry (b. 1943)

1913 births
2002 deaths
Forbes family
Kerry family
Winthrop family
Woolsey family
People in health professions from Paris
American people of Scottish descent
American people of English descent